Bělá, derived from bílá (white), is the name of several places in the Czech Republic:

Bělá (Havlíčkův Brod District), a municipality and village in the Vysočina Region
Bělá (Mírová pod Kozákovem), a village, a part of the municipality Mírová pod Kozákovem
Bělá (Opava District), a municipality and village in the Moravian-Silesian Region
Bělá (Pelhřimov District), a municipality and village in the Vysočina Region
Bělá (Semily District), a municipality and village in the Liberec Region
Bělá nad Radbuzou, a town in the Plzeň Region
Bělá nad Svitavou, a municipality and village in the Pardubice Region
Bělá pod Bezdězem, a town in the Central Bohemian Region
Bělá pod Pradědem, a municipality and village in the Olomouc Region
Bělá u Jevíčka, a municipality and village in the Pardubice Region
Česká Bělá, a market town in the Vysočina Region
Dolní Bělá, a municipality and village in the Plzeň Region
Horní Bělá, a municipality and village in the Plzeň Region
Rohovládova Bělá, a municipality and village in the Pardubice Region
Bělá Castle, a castle near Plzeň
Biela (river), Czech name Bělá, a river of Germany and the Czech Republic

See also
Belá (disambiguation), the Slovakian form of Bělá
Biała (disambiguation), the Polish form of Bělá